General elections were held in Zanzibar on 28 October 2020 alongside the Tanzanian general elections to elect the President and National Assembly of the Semi-autonomous state of Zanzibar. Voters elect the president, Zanzibar House of Representatives and local government councillors. By convention, the election was held on the last Wednesday of October and is supervised by the Zanzibar Election Commission.

The incumbent president, Ali Mohamed Shein, is ineligible to be elected to a third term because of term limits and will be stepping down as president. The president of Zanzibar is the third highest position in the Union government of Tanzania.

Background 
Elections in Zanzibar have often been contentious. The ruling party Chama Cha Mapinduzi has maintained a government within the isles since independence and has never lost an election. The opposition has continually accused the government of cheating their way through the elections and almost every election has resulted in post-election violence. Said violence in 2015 was most heated after the electoral commission's controversial annulment of the elections, citing irregularities. A rerun was held in 2016, however, but the opposition had boycotted the election, giving the ruling party a landslide victory.

Presidential candidates

Chama Cha Mapinduzi 

With incumbent president Ali Mohamed Shein constitutionally bared for a third term, the CCM ticket for presidency was hotly contested. Dr Hussein Mwinyi won the nomination against 31 candidates at the CCM party congress held on July 20, 2020.

Opposition 
Seif Sharif Hamad, will be running for a 6th time for the presidency of Zanzibar, however, under the Alliance for Change and Transparency ticket after he left Civic United Front in March 2019. ACT-Wazalendo held their central committee elections on 5 August 2020. The party's 420 central committee members nominated Seif Hamad with 99.76% vote as the Zanzibar presidential candidate. Hamad ran unopposed and only 1 member of the committee cast a vote against Mr Hamad.

Voters 
The total number of voters registered in Zanzibar are 448,482, which is a decrease of 55,300 from the 2015 elections. It is estimated that almost 120,000 voters were unable to register due to Zanzibar ID Document requirements.

See also 

 Elections in Tanzania
 2020 Tanzanian general election

References 

Zanzibar
Elections in Tanzania
Zanzibar
Presidential elections in Tanzania
Election and referendum articles with incomplete results